Akitiri Sign Language, also known as Eltye eltyarrenke (hand signs), is (or was) a highly developed Australian Aboriginal sign language used by the Kaytetye people of northern Australia.

References

Bibliography
 Hale, Ken (c1960s), Original handwritten lexical list, 3pp.; notes on ‘Kaititj: akitiri sign language’, 3pp. in IATSIS library, MS 4114 Miscellaneous Australian notes of Kenneth L. Hale, Series 2 Barkly Tablelands language material, item 1-2 Wampaya [Wambaya (C19)].

Australian Aboriginal Sign Language family
Arandic languages